A marble gun is a type of an improvised firearm or zip gun that shoots marbles, through gas pressure from the ignition of denatured alcohol. The weapon has been mainly found in Southeast Asia, including a 2014 case in the Vietnam highlands where a boy killed a friend with a marble gun while hunting, and an event where a local Filipino jurisdiction banned the guns, noting they had been confiscated but not penalized in other towns in the region.

See also
Musket
Potato cannon

References

Homemade firearms